The Chamber of Commerce Building in Steamboat Springs, Colorado, at 1201 Lincoln Ave., is a Modern Movement-style building that was designed by architect Eugene D. Sternberg and was built in 1960.  Its 2009 application for NRHP listing describes it as "an unusual application of the Usonian housing style to a commercial building.  It has an inverted gable roof which gives rise to it being known locally as the butterfly building.  The roof accommodates cottonwood tree trunks growing through a hole in its overhang.

It served the Steamboat Springs Chamber of Commerce through at least 1973.  In 2009 it housed the Yampa Valley Land Trust.

It was listed on the Colorado Register of Historic Places in 2009 and the National Register of Historic Places in 2010.

References 

Commercial buildings on the National Register of Historic Places in Colorado
Buildings and structures completed in 1960
Routt County, Colorado
National Register of Historic Places in Routt County, Colorado